"To Earth with Love" is a song English rock band Gay Dad, released on 18 January 1999 as their debut single and lead single from their first album, Leisure Noise. The song peaked at number 10 in the UK Singles Chart and number 35 in New Zealand. A demo version was featured as single of the week in 1998 on the Mark and Lard show.

Accolades

Track listings

UK CD1
 "To Earth with Love" (edit)
 "US Roach"
 "51 Pegasus"

UK CD2
 "To Earth with Love" (full version)
 "How It Might End"
 "Soft Return"

UK 10-inch single
A. "To Earth with Love" (full version)
B. "US Roach"

European CD single
 "To Earth with Love" (radio edit)
 "US Roach"

Australian CD single
 "To Earth with Love" (radio edit)
 "US Roach"
 "Soft Return"
 "51 Pegasus"

Charts

References

1999 debut singles
1998 songs
Gay Dad songs
London Records singles
Song recordings produced by Tony Visconti